Tylospilus acutissimus is a species of predatory stink bug in the family Pentatomidae. It is found in the Caribbean Sea, Central America, North America, and South America.

References

Asopinae
Articles created by Qbugbot
Insects described in 1870